Timbiriche is the debut album from Mexican pop music group Timbiriche. It was released on 30 April 1982. It is also known as Timbiriche "Somos Amigos".

Track listing

References

1982 albums
Timbiriche albums